The 1993 NCAA Division I Women's Lacrosse Championship was the 12th annual single-elimination tournament to determine the national championship of Division I NCAA women's college lacrosse. The championship game was played at Byrd Stadium in College Park, Maryland during May 1993.  All NCAA Division I women's lacrosse programs were eligible for this championship; a total of 6 teams were invited to participate.

Virginia defeated Princeton, 8–6 (in overtime), to win their second national championship.

The leading scorer for the tournament, with 9 goals, was Jenny Bristow, from Princeton. The Most Outstanding Player trophy was not awarded this year.

Teams

Tournament bracket

Tournament outstanding players 
Liz Berkery, Harvard
Betsy Elder, Maryland
Jenny Bristow, Princeton
Erin O'Neill, Princeton
Amory Rowe, Princeton
Cherie Greer, Virginia
Crista Mathes, Virginia
Kim Prendergast, Virginia
Anna Yates, Virginia

See also 
 NCAA Division I Women's Lacrosse Championship
 NCAA Division III Women's Lacrosse Championship
 1993 NCAA Division I Men's Lacrosse Championship

References

NCAA Division I Women's Lacrosse Championship
NCAA Division I Women's Lacrosse Championship
NCAA Women's Lacrosse Championship